Lepturges peruibensis is a species of beetle in the family Cerambycidae. It was described by Monné in 1976.

References

Lepturges
Beetles described in 1976